Pacific Southwest District is the name of:

Pacific Southwest District (Church of the Brethren)
Pacific Southwest District (Lutheran Church–Missouri Synod)